Events from the year 1846 in Ireland.

Events
Ongoing – Great Hunger: The first deaths from hunger take place early in the year. Phytophthora infestans almost totally destroys the summer potato crop and the Famine worsens considerably. By December a third of a million destitute people are employed on public works.
13 March –  Ballinlass incident: eviction of 300 tenants at the village of Ballinlass in County Galway.
22 September – the Great Western Steamship Company's , bound from Liverpool for New York, runs aground in Dundrum Bay (County Down). She lies here for almost a year, protected by temporary measures organised by her designer, I. K. Brunel.
Maziere Brady succeeds Sir Edward Sugden as Lord Chancellor of Ireland, an office which he will hold (with short intervals) until 1866.
HM Prison Crumlin Road in Belfast is opened with the arrival of the first inmates, who are forced to walk from Carrickfergus Prison in chains.
The first substantial English translation of the Annals of the Four Masters, made by Owen Connellan, is published.
The Anglo-Celt newspaper begins weekly publication in Cavan.
Historian Ruaidhrí Ó Flaithbheartaigh (Roderic O'Flaherty)'s Chorographical description of West or Iar Connacht (1684) is first published.

Births
10 February – Lord Charles Beresford, British admiral (died 1919)
13 February – John O'Connor Power, Irish Nationalist politician and Member of Parliament (died 1919).
25 March – Michael Davitt, republican, nationalist agrarian agitator, social campaigner, labour leader and Irish National Land League founder (died 1906).
27 June – Charles Stewart Parnell, Irish nationalist leader (died 1891).
30 June – Frances Margaret Milne, author and librarian (died 1910 in the United States).
22 July – Alfred Perceval Graves, writer (died 1931).
13 August – Otto Jaffe, twice elected as Irish Unionist Party Lord Mayor of Belfast (died 1929).
10 September – John F. Finerty, U.S. Representative from Illinois (died 1908).
18 September – Standish James O'Grady, author, journalist and historian (died 1928).
23 August – Sir Henry Bellingham, 4th Baronet, politician and barrister (died 1921).
9 October – Frank Hugh O'Donnell, writer and nationalist politician (died 1916).
18 November – Samuel Cleland Davidson, inventor and engineer (died 1921)

Deaths
3 April – Zozimus (Michael J. Moran), comic poet (b. c. 1794)
12 October – Lawrence Kavenagh, bushranger (b. c. 1805)
exact date unknown – George Darley, poet, novelist and critic (born 1795).

References

 
1840s in Ireland
Ireland
Years of the 19th century in Ireland